Arvo Pärt's  is a setting of the Latin canticle  for mixed choir a cappella, written in 2001. It was published by Universal Edition.

History 
The Latin canticle  is based on the biblical narration of the Presentation of Jesus at the Temple according to the Gospel of Luke. It is one of only three canticles in the New Testament, along with the Magnificat and the Benedictus. It is part of the daily evening service compline and has often been set to music. In the English choral tradition, it is typically combined with a setting of the Magnificat for Vespers, colloquially called "Mag and Nunc".

Pärt had written a Magnificat in 1989 in Berlin, where the Estonian composer lived.  was commissioned by the choir of St. Mary’s Cathedral in Edinburgh, conducted by Matthew Owens. They first performed it in an Evensong of the 2001 Edinburgh Festival. It was published by Universal Edition.

Text and music 

Pärt set the piece using the biblical text in the Vulgate version. He set it in C-sharp minor for a mixed choir a cappella. The climax, on the words "lumen ad revelationem" (a light to reveal), is prepared by a "measured procession of gradually expanding phrases" and happens shifting from C-sharp minor to C-sharp major. A reviewer noted that "gorgeous textures, harmonies and sonorities conjure a feeling of purity and emptiness."

Recordings 

It was recorded in 2003 in the presence of the composer at London's Temple Church.

 is part of a collection of music by Pärt titled , performed by the Estonian Philharmonic Chamber Choir, conducted by Paul Hillier, with organist Christopher Bowers-Broadbent.

References 

Compositions by Arvo Pärt
2001 compositions
Compositions in C-sharp minor
Choral compositions